Lyavon Barshchewski (born March 4, 1958) is a Belarusian philologist and opposition politician.

Born on March 4, 1958, in Polotsk, Barshchewski graduated from Minsk State Linguistic University in 1980. He was a deputy to the Supreme Soviet of Belarus from 1990 to 1996. He is a member of PEN International. From 2007–2009 he was head of the BPF Party, succeeded by Alaksiej Janukievich.

External links
The White-Red-White Banner of Polish-Belarusian Literature, a Culture.pl article on Barshchewski's anthology of Belarusian poetry Nie Chyliłem Czoła przed Mocą (I Did Not Bow Before Might)

References

1958 births
Living people
Belarusian politicians
Belarusian philologists